Turlough O'Neill may refer to:

 Turlough Luineach O'Neill (1532-1595), head of the O'Neill Dynasty of Ulster
 Turlough MacShane O'Neill (died 1608), an Irish landowner killed during O'Doherty's Rebellion